Vidhwansak (Sanskrit: "The Destroyer") is an Indian multi-caliber anti-materiel rifle (AMR) or large-caliber sniper rifle manufactured by Ordnance Factory Tiruchirappalli. It can be used in the anti-materiel role for destroying enemy bunkers, lightly armoured vehicles, radar systems, communication equipment, parked aircraft, fuel storage facilities, etc. It is also effective in long-range sniping, counter sniping and ordnance disposal roles.

Development 
The Ordnance Factory Tiruchirapalli in association with the Defence Research and Development Organisation developed an anti-materiel rifle Vidhwansak in November 2005. The Denel NTW-20 rifle was used as a starting point for the design. After all-terrain and all-weather trials, the user trials began in March 2006. Production began in February 2007. After trials, the Border Security Force ordered 100 Vidhwansaks for use in the border areas.  These were supplied by October 2008. The rifle has also been offered to the Indian Army and the National Security Guards. However, the Indian Army chose not to bring the Vidhwansak into use as it did not meet the weight requirements.

It is being sold at the cost of Rs 10 lakh (about $20,000) as compared to the Denel NTW-20 AMR, which costs Rs 23 lakhs (about  $45,000) as of 2011.Due to indigenisation of this weapon, foreign exchange worth over  90 million USD  would be saved.

Features 
Vidhwansak is a manually operated, rotating bolt-action rifle. The barrel along with the receiver recoil inside the chassis frame against a damping system. The rifle is fed from a detachable box magazine that is inserted from the left side. The rifle can be quickly disassembled and can be carried in two man-portable packs, each weighing about 12 to 15  kg. A muzzle brake is fitted on the end of the barrel which absorbs an estimated 50-60% of recoil. This is further supplemented by a buffered slide in the receiver. Vidhwansak is equipped with an 8X magnification, long-eye-relief telescopic sight with parallax adjustment. A 12X ballistic scope can also be attached.

The rifle has an effective range of 1,800 m (1,300 m for the 20 mm version), while shots can be achieved even up to 2,000 m. The rifle is magazine fed, and reloaded through manual bolt action.

Variants 
The Vidhwansak can be easily converted between the three calibers - 12.7 mm, 14.5 mm and 20 mm - by replacing the barrel, bolt and magazine, which takes about one minute in the field, without the need for any specialized tools.

Specifications 
The following are current specifications of the Vidhwansak AMR:

Users 

 : Border Security Force
 : Indian Army

See also 
 Denel NTW-20
 RT-20

References

External links 
 
 

12.7 mm sniper rifles
20 mm artillery
20mm sniper rifles
Bolt-action rifles of India
Defence Research and Development Organisation
Anti-materiel rifles